Paludicella is a genus of freshwater bryozoans in the family Paludicellidae.

Species
There are two species:
Paludicella articulata (Ehrenberg, 1831)
Paludicella pentagonalis Annandale, 1916

References

Bryozoan genera
Ctenostomatida